Sankt Margarethen an der Sierning is a municipality in the district of Sankt Pölten-Land in Lower Austria, in northeast Austria.

Population

References

External links 
 www.sankt-margarethen.at - town website

Cities and towns in St. Pölten-Land District